Benedek Litkey (26 March 1942 – 18 June 2011) was a Hungarian sailor. He competed in the Flying Dutchman event at the 1972 Summer Olympics.

References

External links
 

1942 births
2011 deaths
Hungarian male sailors (sport)
Olympic sailors of Hungary
Sailors at the 1972 Summer Olympics – Flying Dutchman
People from Ócsa
Sportspeople from Pest County